Diagnosis: Murder fourth season originally aired Thursdays at 8:00–9:00 pm (EST).

This season is notable for establishing Dr. Mark Sloan's friendships with two other popular TV characters: Ben Matlock and Joe Mannix.

The season was released on DVD Complete and in two parts by Visual Entertainment, Inc.

Cast
Dick Van Dyke as Dr. Mark Sloan
Victoria Rowell as Dr. Amanda Bentley
Charlie Schlatter as Dr. Jesse Travis
Michael Tucci as Norman Briggs
Barry Van Dyke as Steve Sloan

Episodes

References

Diagnosis: Murder seasons
1996 American television seasons
1997 American television seasons